The 9th International Emmy Kids Awards ceremony, presented by the International Academy of Television Arts and Sciences (IATAS), took place on October 14, 2020. The nominations were announced on September 10, 2020.

Ceremony information
Nominations for the 9th International Emmy Kids Awards were announced on September 10, 2020 by the International Academy of Television Arts and Sciences (IATAS). The winners were announced on October 14, 2020. The winners spanned series from Australia and the United Kingdom. This is the second time this year that the Academy has presented Kids Emmys; the accelerated schedule is due to various factors related to the Covid-19 virus.

Winners

References

External links 
 International Academy of Television Arts and Sciences website

International Emmy Kids Awards ceremonies
International Emmy Kids Awards
International Emmy Kids Awards
International Emmy Kids Awards